Logan Russell (born 26 October 1999) is a Bahamian footballer who plays as a defender and midfielder for the Bahamas national team. He is a current Bible and Theology major at Wheaton College (Il).

Career statistics

International

References

External links
 Logan Russell at the Bowdoin College
 Logan Russell at the Wheaton College

1999 births
Living people
Association football defenders
Bahamian footballers
Bahamas youth international footballers
Bahamas international footballers
Bahamian expatriate footballers
Bahamian expatriate sportspeople in the United States
Expatriate soccer players in the United States
Bowdoin Polar Bears men's soccer players
Wheaton Thunder men's soccer players